The Newman Guide to Choosing a Catholic College (also termed as The Newman Guide) is a college evaluation tool published annually by the Cardinal Newman Society to assist students in choosing a Catholic college or university. It includes a list of Catholic institutions of higher education selected for their perceived adherence to Catholic teaching. The guide seeks to include schools which comport with the principles of Ex Corde Ecclesiae.

Description 
First published in 2007, the Guide identifies a subset of the Catholic colleges in the United States, as well as colleges and universities abroad and online where, in the Society's view, "students can reasonably expect a faithful Catholic education and a campus culture that generally upholds the values taught in their homes and parishes."

The Guide claims "to show students where they can learn and grow in a genuine Catholic environment without the nonsense that has overtaken even some of the most well-known Catholic universities."

The Newman Guide is published both in printed book form and online.  The Guide's website includes all of the information for free.

Recommended colleges (2019)

U.S. Residential Colleges

Ave Maria University (Ave Maria, FL)
Belmont Abbey College (Belmont, NC)
Benedictine College (Atchison, KS)
The Catholic University of America (Washington D.C.)
Christendom College (Front Royal, VA)
Franciscan University of Steubenville (Steubenville, OH)
John Paul the Great Catholic University (Escondido, CA)
Magdalen College of the Liberal Arts (Warner, NH)
Thomas Aquinas College (Santa Paula, CA)
Thomas More College of Liberal Arts (Merrimack, NH)
University of Dallas (Irving, TX)
University of Mary (Bismarck, ND)
University of St. Thomas (Houston, TX)
Walsh University (North Canton, OH)
Wyoming Catholic College (Lander, WY)

U.S. Non-residential, International, or Online Institutions

Aquinas College
Campion College
Catholic Distance University
Catholic Pacific College (Vancouver, BC)
Holy Angel University
Holy Apostles College and Seminary (Cromwell, CT)
Ignatius-Angelicum Great Books Program
International Theological Institute (Austria)
Our Lady Seat of Wisdom College (Barry's Bay, ON)
Pontifical University of Saint Thomas Aquinas (Rome, Italy)
University of Navarra (Spain)

References

External links 
The Newman Guide Colleges

University and college rankings in the United States
Traditionalist Catholicism
Catholic universities and colleges
Social conservatism
Conservatism in the United States